The Aeri de Montserrat is an aerial cable car which provides one of the means of access to the Montserrat mountain and abbey. It can be found 1 hour from the city of Barcelona, Catalonia, Spain.

Travelers using the cable car should take note of its operating hours to avoid being stranded on the mountain, as it is operated by a separate company than the rack railroad and funiculars, and is not coordinated with them.

The line runs from the monastery to the station of Montserrat-Aeri, on the Ferrocarrils de la Generalitat de Catalunya (FGC) line from Barcelona-Plaça d'Espanya station to Manresa. The FGC operates the Montserrat Rack Railway, which provides an alternative access to the mountain and abbey, and two funicular railways on the mountain, the Funicular de Sant Joan and the Funicular de Santa Cova.

See also
 Port Vell Aerial Tramway, aerial tramway in Barcelona
 Montjuïc Aerial Tramway, aerial tramway in Barcelona
 , aerial tramway near Barcelona

External links 

 
Article on the Aeri de Montserrat including technical pictures

Montserrat
Aerial tramways in Spain